Sedley is an unincorporated community in Union Township, Porter County, in the U.S. state of Indiana.

History
A post office was established at Sedley in 1883, and remained in operation until 1910. The community was a station on the Grand Trunk Railroad.

Geography

References

Unincorporated communities in Porter County, Indiana
Unincorporated communities in Indiana